The 2013–14 Biathlon World Cup – relay women started on Saturday December 7, 2013, in Hochfilzen. Defending titlist is Norway.

Competition format
The relay teams consist of four biathletes, who each ski , each leg skied over three laps, with two shooting rounds; one prone, one standing. For every round of five targets there are eight bullets available, though the last three can only be single-loaded manually, one at a time, from spare round holders or bullets deposited by the competitor into trays or onto the mat at the firing line. If, after eight bullets, there are still misses, one 150 m penalty loop must be taken for each missed target. The first-leg participants all start  at the same time, and, as in cross-country skiing relays, every athlete of a team must touch the team's next-leg participant to perform a valid changeover. On the first shooting stage of the first leg, the participant must shoot in the lane corresponding to their bib number (bib No.10 shoots at lane No.10 regardless of position in race), then for the remainder of the relay, the relay team shoots at the lane in the position they arrived (arrive at the range in fifth place, shoot at lane five).

2012–13 Top 3 Standings

Medal winners

Standings

References

Relay Women